The Exploradôme is a science museum located in Vitry-sur-Seine in the Val-de-Marne, France. It was founded by Goéry Delacôte. It is open daily; an admission fee is charged.

The museum opened in 1998. Its permanent exhibition contains interactive objects designed and produced by the Exploratorium in San Francisco, including optical illusions, turbulent motion, structures and forms, and movement. The museum also contains temporary exhibits, and provides workshops for children and teenagers.

See also 
 List of museums in Paris

References 

 Exploradome
 Museums of Paris entry
 Home and Abroad description

Museums in Val-de-Marne
Science museums in France
Museums established in 1998